Frederik Due (born 18 July 1992) is a Danish professional footballer who last played as a goalkeeper for Eliteserien club Sandefjord.

Professional

Due played in his native Denmark from 2010 to 2018 for HB Køge and Randers.

On 23 January 2019, Due joined Hartford Athletic in the American USL Championship, becoming the fifth Dane to join the first-year team led by Danish head coach Jimmy Nielsen. Due was injured in pre season camp and did not make his debut with the team until May 25 when he started against the Ottawa Fury FC. He was transferd to Orange County SC on August 21, 2019 having made 15 starts for Hartford including the team's first ever clean sheet and first win at their home park of Dillon Stadium. He started Orange County's playoff game and was re signed for the 2020 season December 6, 2019.

Due moved to Norwegian first division club Sandefjord in early 2021.

References

1992 births
Living people
Danish men's footballers
People from Køge Municipality
Sportspeople from Region Zealand
HB Køge players
Randers FC players
Association football goalkeepers
Danish expatriate men's footballers
Expatriate soccer players in the United States
Danish expatriate sportspeople in the United States
Expatriate footballers in Norway
Danish expatriate sportspeople in Norway
Hartford Athletic players
Orange County SC players
Sandefjord Fotball players
Danish Superliga players
USL Championship players